Joséphine de Meaux (born 23 January 1977) is a French actress and director.

Career
Passionate for comedy since she was young (she went up on stage when she was just 10 years old), she got her first stint in theater at 17 years old.

She studied at the French National Academy of Dramatic Arts from 1999 to 2002, acting in several plays under the direction of professionals.

She first played in theater as an actor as well as a director, and then started a career in cinema.

Theater

Filmography

Actress

Director / Writer

References

1977 births
Living people
French film actresses
French television actresses
People from Boulogne-Billancourt
21st-century French actresses
French National Academy of Dramatic Arts alumni